Louis-Michel Viger (September 28, 1785 – May 27, 1855) was a Quebec lawyer, businessman, seigneur and political figure.

He was born in Montreal in 1785 and studied at the Collège Saint-Raphaël at the same time as his cousin, Louis-Joseph Papineau. He articled in law with his cousin, Denis-Benjamin Viger, was admitted to the bar in 1807 and set up practice in Montreal. Viger was a member of the local militia and served as a lieutenant during the War of 1812. In 1824, he married Marie-Ermine, daughter of Louis Turgeon, seigneur of Beaumont. In 1830, he was elected to represent Chambly in the Legislative Assembly of Lower Canada as a member of the parti patriote and voted for the Ninety-Two Resolutions. He was elected again in 1834. In 1835, in partnership with Jacob De Witt, he set up La Banque du Peuple to counter the Bank of Montreal's monopoly in the province. Because he had played an important role in protest meetings organized before the Lower Canada Rebellion, Viger was arrested in November 1837 and charged with treason. He was released in August 1838 and then jailed again for a short time later that same year.

Viger protested against the union of Lower Canada and Upper Canada into the Province of Canada in 1841 and the irregularities in the elections that followed. He was elected to the Legislative Assembly of the Province of Canada for Nicolet in an 1842 by-election. His wife had died in 1839 and, in 1843, he married Aurélie, the daughter of Joseph-Édouard Faribault, who was then seigneur of L'Assomption after the death of her first husband. Viger was elected in Terrebonne in 1848; he served as receiver general in the Executive Council from 1848 to 1849, resigning when the capital moved from Montreal to Toronto. He was elected to the assembly again for Leinster in 1851.

He died of a stroke in L'Assomption in 1855 and was buried at Repentigny.

References

External links

1785 births
1855 deaths
Members of the Legislative Assembly of Lower Canada
Members of the Legislative Assembly of the Province of Canada from Canada East
People from Montreal